The Memphis Music Hall of Fame, located in Memphis, Tennessee, honors Memphis musicians for their lifetime achievements in music. The induction ceremony and concert is held each year in Memphis. Since its establishment in 2012, the Hall of Fame has inducted more than 48 individuals or groups. It is administered by the non-profit Memphis Rock N' Soul Museum. In July 2015, the Memphis Music Hall of Fame opened a 'brick and mortar' museum and exhibit hall, which features memorabilia, video interviews, and interactive exhibits.

History
The Memphis Music Hall of Fame, created as a tribute to the city's wide-ranging role in the fields of blues, gospel, jazz, R&B, country, rockabilly and hip-hop, was launched on November 29, 2012, featuring an induction ceremony for its first 25 honorees at the Cannon Center for the Performing Arts.

Each inductee into the Memphis Music Hall of Fame receives the Mike Curb Award, named after songwriter, producer and record company owner, Mike Curb. Annual inductees are selected by a Nominating Committee composed of nationally recognized authors, producers, historians and leaders in the music industry. The number of annual inductees may vary.

On August 1, 2015, the Memphis Music Hall of Fame opened its museum and exhibition hall at 126 S. 2nd Street between the Hard Rock Cafe and Lansky Brothers' Clothier. The museum features memorabilia and other archival materials from nearly all of the 60 inductees.

Inductees

2012

Jim Stewart & Estelle Axton
Bobby "Blue" Bland 
Booker T. & the M.G.'s
Lucie Campbell
George Coleman
Jim Dickinson
Al Green
W.C. Handy
Isaac Hayes
Howlin' Wolf
B.B. King
Jerry Lee Lewis
Jimmie Lunceford
Professor W.T. McDaniel
Memphis Minnie
Willie Mitchell
Dewey Phillips
Sam Phillips
Elvis Presley
Otis Redding
The Staple Singers
Rufus Thomas
Three 6 Mafia
Nat D. Williams
ZZ Top

2013

The Bar-Kays
The Blackwood Brothers
Rev. Herbert Brewster
Johnny Cash
Roland Janes
Albert King
Memphis Jug Band
Phineas Newborn, Jr.
David Porter
Sid Selvidge
Kay Starr
Carla Thomas

2014
Lil Hardin Armstrong
Al Bell
Big Star
John Fry
Furry Lewis
Chips Moman
Ann Peebles
Carl Perkins
Jesse Winchester

2015

Alberta Hunter
Al Jackson, Jr.
Memphis Slim
Scotty Moore
Charlie Rich
Sam & Dave
Justin Timberlake

2016 
 William Bell
 Hi Rhythm Section
 John Lee Hooker
 Charles Lloyd
 Marguerite Piazza
 Sam "The Sham" Samudio

2017 
 Roy Orbison
 Memphis Horns
 Maurice White
 Frank Stokes
 Cassietta George
 Irvin Salky
 Jack Clement

2018 

 Aretha Franklin
 The Box Tops
 8Ball & MJG
 The Rock and Roll Trio
 Eddie Floyd
 George Klein
 O'Landa Draper

2019 

 Tina Turner
 Steve Cropper
 Charlie Musselwhite
 Dan Penn
 Don Bryant
 Dee Dee Bridgewater
 The Memphis Boys 
 Florence Cole Talbert-McCleave

2022

Fred Ford
Jim Gaines
Booker T. Jones
Ronnie Milsap
Priscilla Presley
Billy Lee Riley
Mavis Staples
J.M. Van Eaton

See also
 List of music museums
Memphis Rock N' Soul Museum

References

External links

Music halls of fame
Halls of fame in Tennessee
Museums in Memphis, Tennessee
Buildings and structures in Memphis, Tennessee
Awards established in 2012
2012 establishments in Tennessee
Music museums in Tennessee